An adverse event (AE) is any untoward medical occurrence in a patient or clinical investigation subject administered a pharmaceutical product and which does not necessarily have a causal relationship with this treatment. An adverse event can therefore be any unfavourable and unintended sign (including an abnormal laboratory finding), symptom, or disease temporally associated with the use of a medicinal (investigational) product, whether or not related to the medicinal (investigational) product.

AEs in patients participating in clinical trials must be reported to the study sponsor and if required could be reported to the local ethics committee. Adverse events categorized as "serious" (results in death, illness requiring hospitalization, events deemed life-threatening, results in persistent or significant incapacity, a congenital anomaly, birth defect or medically important condition) must be reported to the regulatory authorities immediately, whereas non-serious adverse events are merely documented in the annual summary sent to the regulatory authority.

The sponsor collects AE reports from the local researchers, and notifies all participating sites of the AEs at the other sites, as well as both the local investigators' and the sponsors' judgment of the seriousness of the AEs. This process allows the sponsor and all the local investigators access to a set of data that might suggest potential problems with the study treatment while the study is still ongoing.

Types of adverse events
All clinical trials have the potential to produce AEs. AEs are classified as serious or non-serious; expected or unexpected; and study-related, possibly study-related, or not study-related.

For example, while a study that tests the effectiveness of a new blood pressure cuff for a period of 10 minutes might seem innocuous, the potential exists for the patient's skin to be irritated by the device. Patients in that study might also die during that 10-minute period. Both skin irritation and sudden death would be considered AEs. In this case, the skin irritation would be classified as not serious, unexpected, and possibly study-related. The death would be classified as serious and unexpected (unless the patient was already at death's door). The local researcher would use his/her medical judgment to determine whether the death could have been related to the study device.

Both the skin irritation and the death are unexpected events, and should alert the researcher to the potential existence of a problem with the device (for instance, it could have malfunctioned and shocked the patient). The researcher would report these AEs to the local Institutional Review Board and to the sponsor, and await direction on whether to stop the study. If the researcher feels there is an imminent danger posed by the device, he or she can use medical discretion to stop patients from participating in the study.

An adverse event can also be declared in the normal treatment of a patient which is suspected of being caused by the medication being taken or a medical device used in the treatment of the patient.

In Australia, 'Adverse EVENT' refers generically to medical errors of all kinds, surgical, medical or nursing related. The most recent available official study (1995) indicated 18,000 deaths per year are a result of hospital care. The Medical Error Action Group is lobbying for legislation to improve the reporting of AEs and through quality control, minimize the needless deaths.

Reporting of adverse events

Researchers participating in a clinical trial must report all adverse events to the drug regulatory authority of the respective country where the drug or device is to be registered [e.g.  Food and Drug Administration (FDA) if it is US]. Serious AEs must be reported immediately; minor AEs are 'bundled' by the sponsor and submitted later.

The type of method used to elicit AEs reported by individuals for evidence on likely adverse drug reactions (ADRs) influences the extent and nature of data. A 2018 review conducted found that some participants in clinical drug trials were asked simple open questions (i.e. 'how are you feeling?'), while in other trials, participants were given lengthy questionnaires about physical symptoms (i.e. 'do you experience muscle soreness or headaches?'. A 2022 review on adverse events in Human challenge trials found that reporting improved over time, but remains non-standardized in ways that make comparisons difficult.

As there is a lack of consensus on how AEs should be assessed, there is a concern that the kinds of questions and the phrasing of questions may lead to measurement error and impede comparisons between studies and pooled analysis. However, Allen et al. concluded that the impact of the AE detected by different methods is unclear.

Grades of AE
Clinical trial results often report the number of grade 3 and grade 4 adverse events.
Grades are defined:
Grade 1 Mild AE
Grade 2 Moderate AE
Grade 3 Severe AE
Grade 4 Life-threatening or disabling AE
Grade 5 Death related to AE

Database of adverse events

The FDA provides a database for reporting of adverse events called the Manufacturer and User Facility Device Experience Database (MAUDE)[1]. The data consist of voluntary reports since June 1993, user facility reports since 1991, distributor reports since 1993, and manufacturer reports since August 1996, and is open for public view. Two private companies have also recently started providing access to analyzed adverse event information: Clarimed provides adverse event information for medical devices and AdverseEvents provides adverse event data for drugs.

See also 

 Clinical trial
 Complication (medicine)
 Good clinical practice (GCP)
 Data monitoring committees
 Serious adverse event
 Adverse effect
 Adverse drug reaction
 Adverse vaccine event
 Adverse outcome pathway
 Antibody-dependent enhancement
 Pharmacovigilance
 EudraVigilance (European Union AE reporting and evaluating network)
 Clinical Trials Directive (Directive 2001/20/EC by European Union)
Vaccine-associated enhanced respiratory disease
 Adverse Event Reporting System
 Yellow Card Scheme

References

External links 
ClinicalTrials.gov from US National Library of Medicine
ICH Website 
FDA Website

Clinical research
Pharmaceutical industry